Franc Kacijanar (born in Oberburg, Bern) was a Swiss clergyman and bishop for the Roman Catholic Archdiocese of Ljubljana. He was ordained in 1537. He was appointed bishop in 1538. He died in 1543.

References 

1543 deaths
Swiss Roman Catholic bishops